The 2014 New Zealand Grand Prix event for open wheel racing cars was held at Manfeild Autocourse near Feilding on 9 February 2014. It was the fifty-ninth New Zealand Grand Prix and was open to Toyota Racing Series cars. The event was also the third race of the fifth round of the 2014 Toyota Racing Series, the final race of the series.

Twenty Tatuus-Toyota cars started the race which was won by Nick Cassidy for the third time in a row, something last achieved by Craig Baird from 1991 to 1993.

Classification

Qualifying

Race

References

External links
 Toyota Racing Series

Grand Prix
New Zealand Grand Prix
Toyota Racing Series
February 2014 sports events in New Zealand